Atopomonas hussainii is a species of pseudomonad bacteria.

References 

Pseudomonadales
Bacteria genera